Parmanjan Kyum (born 1 February 2001) is a Chinese footballer currently playing as a forward for Henan Songshan Longmen, on loan from Guangzhou Evergrande.

Club career
Parmanjan Kyum was promoted to the senior team of Guangzhou Evergrande within the 2020 Chinese Super League season and would make his debut in a league game on 30 July 2020 against Guangzhou R&F in a 5-0 victory.

Career statistics

References

External links

2001 births
Living people
Chinese footballers
Association football forwards
Chinese Super League players
Guangzhou F.C. players